Kristiansand Cathedral is a cathedral of the Church of Norway in Kristiansand Municipality in Agder county, Norway. It is located in the Kvadraturen area in the central part of the city of Kristiansand. It is the church for the Kristiansand domkirken parish which is the seat of the Kristiansand domprosti (arch-deanery) in the Diocese of Agder og Telemark. The cathedral is also the seat of the Bishop of Agder and Telemark. The gray, brick church was built in a Neo-Gothic cruciform design in 1885 using plans drawn up by the architect Henrik Thrap-Meyer. The church seats about 1,000 people, making it one of the largest cathedrals in Norway. This cathedral is the fourth church and third cathedral to be located on this site over the centuries.

Overview
Kristiansand Cathedral is a Neo-Gothic church built of brick and cement in a cruciform plan with 1,750 seats. The church was designed by the architect Henrik Thrap-Meyer. Construction began in 1880 and was completed on 1 February 1885. The church was consecrated on 18 March 1885 by the provost Johan M. Brun who was serving as acting bishop.

Originally the cathedral had 2,029 seats and room for an additional 1,216 people to stand, but seating has now been reduced so the building can comfortably seat about 1,000. To re-use the walls of the previous cathedral, which burned down in 1880, the altar was positioned at the west end, rather than in the traditional position in the east.

The cathedral received a carillon with 36 bells as a gift from Falconbridge Nikkelverk in 1990, created by Olsen Nauen Bell Foundry.

Kristiansand Cathedral received a new church organ, built by the German supplier Klais in 2013, comprising a 58-voice main organ at the eastern balcony and another of 9 voices at the northern balcony.

History
The cathedral is in the same location as three previous buildings. The first, called  (Trinity Church), a small wooden church, was built in 1645. When Kristiansand was appointed the seat of the diocese in 1682, construction began on the town's first cathedral, called  (Our Saviour's Church). That first cathedral, built in stone, was consecrated in 1696, but burned down in 1734. The second cathedral, Vor Frues Kirke (Our Lady's Church), consecrated in 1738, was destroyed by a fire that affected the whole city, on 18 December 1880. This cathedral has been reconstructed and rebuilt in size 1:10. The model is on display at the Vest-Agder Museum Kristiansand. It was built by a group of enthusiastic model builders.

The current cathedral, which is larger than its predecessors, was consecrated in 1885. When the 1940 Nazi attack on Kristiansand took place early in the morning of 9 April 1940, the -tall cathedral tower was hit by an artillery shell, which damaged the upper part.

Gallery

See also 
List of cathedrals in Norway
List of churches in Agder og Telemark

References

External links 

 
 
Virtual Interior Kristiansand Cathedral, 360° Panorama (New church organs)
View from the Church Tower VIDEO

Cathedrals in Norway
Churches in Kristiansand
Lutheran cathedrals in Norway
Brick churches in Norway
Cruciform churches in Norway
19th-century Church of Norway church buildings
Churches completed in 1885
1645 establishments in Norway